Egg marking is a form of egg labelling that includes an egg code stamped on the egg itself. In the EU there is a producer code regulated by law since 2004. It allows consumers to distinguish free range eggs and organic farming eggs from the industrial caged hen production.

Egg mark contents 
An egg mark may contain a number of information parts - in the EU only the producer code is required. Additional information may be printed along with the date of production being the most common to find. Other information may contain the method of production especially in the non-EU world where the numbered levels do not apply.

Note that egg labelling is used worldwide but mostly in the form of egg carton labels. In most countries there are legal definitions on the designation of the egg size, production method, packager identification and best-before dates. As there is more space on the carton there has been no tendency to create an egg code that is seen on the stamps used for egg marking.

Producer code 

The European Union has defined an egg code that consists of

 a number indicating the method of production
 a two letter code for the country of origin
 a registration number indicating the hen laying establishment

The egg stamp is required in the EU on all class A eggs unless these are sold directly on the farm.

Method of production 

The first number of the egg code defines four methods of hens raising:

 0 = organic egg production
 1 = free-range eggs
 2 = deep litter indoor housing
 3 = cage farming

Each raising method has different requirements defined.

In the European Union these levels have strict minimum requirements:

 caged: this had a requirement of 550 cm² minimum space per hen. However the EU has banned battery cages by 2012 through an update of EC Directive 1999/74/EC. The new minimum is 750 cm² in furnished cages.
 indoor: the minimum space per hen is increased to 1100 cm² (or 9 hens per square meter). No cages are allowed and instead the hens may sit on an elevated porch in large barn that has a floor covered with sawdust or better.
 free-range: in addition to the barn (with 1100 cm² indoor space per hen) there must be an outdoor space for the hens with continuous daytime access. There is a minimum of 4 m² of outdoor space per hen.
 organic: the indoor space is increased to 1667 cm² (or 6 hens per square meter); the available outdoor space has a minimum of 4 m² with grown pasture for the poultry, and the remaining food must come from organic production.

Some countries had banned battery cages before the EU regulation was enacted, for example in Austria by 2009 and in Germany by 2010. A number of countries have later adopted regulations to completely ban cage farming (including the furnished cage option), for example Switzerland, Germany and the UK with a transition period to 2025.

Country code 
The country code follows the ISO two-letter country codes (also known from country code top-level domains). This includes

Registration number 
In most countries the registration number starts with a region code where the egg production facilities are situated:
 Germany - 01 Schleswig-Holstein, 02 Hamburg, 03 Lower Saxony, 04 Bremen, 05 North Rhine-Westphalia, 06 Hesse, 07 Rhineland-Palatinate, 08 Baden-Württemberg, 09 Bavaria, 11 Berlin, 12 Brandenburg, 13 Mecklenburg-West Pomerania, 14 Saxony, 15 Saxony-Anhalt, 16 Thuringia
 Austria - 1 Burgenland, 2 Carinthia, 3 Lower Austria, 4 Upper Austria, 5 Salzburg, 6 Styria, 7 Tyrol, 8 Vorarlberg, 9 Vienna

Note that a producer with multiple barns will have to register each barn separately.

Criticism 

There have been multiple occurrences of the producer code being forged - a common concept is to have multiple barns on the same farm with some having efficient caged hen production and one with an organic egg production code. Eggs are then silently moved to the other barn giving an egg code as if they were from organic production allowing for a higher price on the market. In Lower Saxony (Germany) the state attorney has accused 150 farmers in a year.

The mark on organic egg production as level 0 might indicate that there is nothing better than that. However it does not indicate sustainable agriculture where hens are fed from the organic farm alone. Also species-appropriate husbandry would require more space per hen or a lower number of hens per barn (or even have a cock around to calm down quarrels). Instead there are higher organic farming standards (e.g. Demeter or Bioland) that can not be expressed in the established egg code system. The difference in space per animal is limited between levels 1 and 0.

Also, egg marking does not say anything about other conditions of hens' raising that have been criticized by animal advocates, like the mass killing of male chicks or the painful trimming of hens' beaks.

See also 
 Organic certification – organic products must bear a registration number that allows to trace back the ingredients.
 Bio mit Gesicht – additional producer mark in organic farming with a database to show the farm
 Free range standards development across the world

References

External links
 Austrian database 
 German database  
 additional mark guidelines 

Eggs (food)
European Union food law
Poultry farming